Anthony Briançon (born 28 November 1994) is a French professional footballer who plays as a defensive midfielder for  club Saint-Étienne.

Career
Briançon is a youth exponent from Nîmes. He made his Ligue 2 debut at 16 May 2014 against Créteil, replacing Pierre Bouby after 54 minutes in a 1–1 away draw.

On 22 June 2022, Briançon signed for newly-relegated Ligue 2 side Saint-Étienne on a three-year contract.

References

1994 births
Living people
Sportspeople from Avignon
French footballers
Association football midfielders
Nîmes Olympique players
AS Saint-Étienne players
Ligue 1 players
Ligue 2 players
Championnat National 3 players